Syeda Mehrbano Kazim, known by the stage name Juggun "Jay" Kazim, is a Pakistani Canadian actress, television host, and YouTube personality. She has worked in numerous Pakistani and Canadian films. She is the brand ambassador for Garnier Fructis Pakistan.

Personal life
Juggan Kazim was born in Lahore, Punjab, Pakistan to a Kashmiri Punjabi Muslim family. She has an elder sister and a younger brother. Her uncle, Raza Kazim, is a lawyer and supporter of the arts. The famed journalist Nasim Zehra is her aunt.

Her parents separated when she was a year old. Her father, Syed Abbas Kazim, let her work as a child model because "he looked upon it as something cute", she says, even though her family considered acting—her ambition from an early age—to be too lowly a field for a girl of her station. Her father was conservative in his ideas about women, and her mother, Ghazala Saigol, was more modern.

She attended Kinnaird College and the King's College, Canada, where she received a Bachelor of Arts degree in Media. She also holds a Cisco Certified Network Associate certification.

In December 2004, Kazim returned from Canada to Pakistan, when she married with Ahmed Tajik, she met him while attending a friend's wedding. After just over a year of marriage, during which Ahmed beat her, she left him, taking their two-month-old son, Hamza, with her. The father is not involved in her son's upbringing; she says this was a mutual decision, influenced by her experiences as the child of divorced parents. She married Feisal H Naqvi, with whom she has another son, Hassan, on 27 June 2013 and a daughter, Noor Bano on 9 October 2020.

Juggan Kazim is fluent in Urdu, English as well as Punjabi.

Career
Kazim has been involved in media work since she was four years old. In 1985–86 she did advertisements for Samsonite and other products.

She appeared in her first commercial play when she was fourteen, directed by her best friend Mashal Peerzada.  Her professional career, where she started using the name "Juggan Kazim", began in Toronto, when Sutherland Models approached her to work as a model. Kazim made her feature film debut in the lead role of "Gugan" in the Gaurav Seth's film Pink Ludoos opposite Shaheen Khan (known for Bend It Like Beckham). Since then, she appeared in an episode of David Wellington's The Eleventh Hour, directed by T.W. Peacock. Kazim hosted her own television show at age 16 until she left Pakistan to pursue her passion for acting in North America. She has also appeared in numerous stage productions in her home town as well as in Toronto. Most recently she played the lead and title role in "Tara" produced by Rasik Arts under the direction of Sally Jones. She mainly does print modeling; her  stature makes her think that "I'd look rather stupid walking the ramp." After two music videos with Sutherland, she was approached by Newton Landry Management, who remain her Canadian agents.

After returning to Pakistan, she started hosting television with the show Beanbag, which she also conceived and wrote. Since then, she has hosted a number of shows for various Pakistani networks. In March 2010, Kazim was named as L'Oréal's "Brand Ambassador" for their Garnier brand of hair and skin-care products in Pakistan.
In 2010, Juggan won Best Supporting Actress Award for Meri Unsuni Kahani on Pakistan Media Award.

In March 2011, Kazim acted opposite Shaan Shahid in Altaf Hussain's Lollywood film Khamosh Raho. , Hussain planned to release the film in Pakistan on 10 June 2011. She is also starring opposite Mohib Mirza, Sanam Baloch and Sunita Marshall in Mirza's upcoming film Silent Cinema.

Since 2011, she is the host of the show "Morning with Juggun" which airs on Pakistan Television Corporation's (PTV Home) on weekdays.

Filmography

Television

TV Host of programs
 Beanbag (Business Plus)
 CEO (Business Plus)
 Aaj Entertainment Tonight (Aaj TV)
 Fashion Stop (Ary Digital)
 Sunday Brunch (Aaj TV)
 Morning with Hum-Weekend Edition (Hum TV)
 Aik Din Juggun Kay Saath (Vibe TV)
 Honestly Speaking with Juggun Kazim (PTV)
 The Final Verdict with Juggun Kazim (Filmax)
 VIPs only (Aag TV)
 Mast Mornings (Dawn News)
 Yeh Subh Tumhari Hai (Express News)
  Morning with Juggun'' (PTV home)

See also 
 List of Pakistani actresses

References

External links
  Filmography of Juggan Kazim on IMDb website
 

1980 births
Living people
Pakistani emigrants to Canada
Naturalized citizens of Canada
Pakistani television hosts
Pakistani film actresses
Pakistani female models
Pakistani television actresses
Actresses from Lahore
University of Western Ontario alumni
Lahore Grammar School alumni
Kinnaird College for Women University alumni
Pakistani people of Kashmiri descent
21st-century Pakistani actresses
Pakistani women television presenters
Pakistani YouTubers